Brain-specific angiogenesis inhibitor 3 is a protein that in humans is encoded by the BAI3 gene.

BAI1, a p53-target gene, encodes brain-specific angiogenesis inhibitor, a seven-span transmembrane protein and is thought to be a member of the secretin receptor family. Brain-specific angiogenesis proteins BAI2 and BAI3 are similar to BAI1 in structure, have similar tissue specificities and may also play a role in angiogenesis. The BAI3 receptor has also been found to regulate dendrite morphogenesis, arborization growth and branching in cultured neurons.

The adhesion GPCR BaI3 is an orphan receptor that has a long N-terminus consisting of one cub domain, five BaI Thrombospondin type 1 repeats, and one hormone binding domain. BaI3 is expressed in neural tissues of the central nervous system.  BaI3 has been shown to have a high affinity for C1q proteins.  C1q added to hippocampal neurons expressing BaI3 resulted in a decrease in the number of synapses.

References

Further reading

External links 
 

G protein-coupled receptors